Zachary Aaron Curtis (born July 4, 1992), is an American former professional baseball pitcher. He  played in Major League Baseball (MLB) for the Arizona Diamondbacks, Seattle Mariners, Philadelphia Phillies, and Texas Rangers.

Career

Arizona Diamondbacks
Curtis attended Hendersonville High School in Hendersonville, Tennessee. He played college baseball at Volunteer State Community College and Middle Tennessee State University. The Arizona Diamondbacks selected Curtis in the sixth round of the 2014 MLB draft. He made his professional debut in 2014 with the Hillsboro Hops. Curtis was called up to the majors for the first time on April 30, 2016, and made his major league debut that night.

Seattle Mariners
On November 23, 2016, the Diamondbacks traded Curtis to the Seattle Mariners, along with Jean Segura and Mitch Haniger, for Taijuan Walker and Ketel Marte. 

He began the 2017 season with the Arkansas Travelers of the Double-A Texas League and was called up by the Mariners on May 11, 2017. He pitched his first game for the Mariners that evening against the Toronto Blue Jays at Rogers Centre in Toronto. On September 4, Curtis was designated for assignment.

Philadelphia Phillies
On September 11, 2017, the Philadelphia Phillies claimed Curtis off waivers. Curtis was designated for assignment on July 31, 2018.

Texas Rangers
On August 7, 2018, the Texas Rangers claimed Curtis off waivers and immediately optioned to Triple A. He was promoted to the major leagues on September 1, 2018.

On December 17, 2018, Curtis re-signed with the Texas Rangers on a minor-league contract, after being non-tendered earlier in the offseason. He was assigned to the Triple-A Nashville Sounds to open the 2019 season. Curtis was released by Texas on July 12.

Personal life
Curtis married Chelsea Richardson in 2014. They met at Volunteer State Community College.

References

External links

1992 births
Living people
Baseball players from Tennessee
Major League Baseball pitchers
Arizona Diamondbacks players
Seattle Mariners players
Philadelphia Phillies players
Texas Rangers players
Volunteer State Pioneers baseball players
Middle Tennessee Blue Raiders baseball players
Hillsboro Hops players
Kane County Cougars players
Visalia Rawhide players
Mobile BayBears players
Arkansas Travelers players
Lehigh Valley IronPigs players
Round Rock Express players
Nashville Sounds players